Paraglenea transversefasciata is a species of beetle in the family Cerambycidae. It was described by Stephan von Breuning in 1952. It is known from Thailand.

References

Saperdini
Beetles described in 1952